This is the discography of Australian rock music group Little River Band. To the present they have released 18 studio albums, four live albums, and numerous compilation albums.

Albums

Studio albums

Live albums

Compilation albums
The Little River Band have released numerous compilations; both official and unofficial. Below is a list of those that have charted on a national chart.

Singles

VHS and DVD releases

References

External links
 Little River Band official website

Discographies of Australian artists
Rock music group discographies
Discography